The Adventurer is a 1922 German silent film directed by Lothar Mendes and starring Michael Bohnen, Rudolf Forster and Olga Limburg.

Cast
 Michael Bohnen as Van Hamm
 Rudolf Forster as Bergström
 Olga Limburg as Nelly Murdfield
 Robert Leffler as Joshua Hunter, Farmer
 Hanni Weisse as Maud, seine Tochter
 Herbert Stock as Walker, der Wirt
 Edith Meller as Lizzi, seine Tochter
 Maria Forescu as Peddy, seine Frau
 Georg John as der rote Johnny
 Alfred Viebach as Conte d'Avido
 Georg H. Schnell as Verwalter der Farm
 Paul Rehkopf as Wirt der Hafenkneipe

References

Bibliography

External links

1922 films
Films of the Weimar Republic
Films directed by Lothar Mendes
German silent feature films
German black-and-white films